Fritz "Itze" Gunst (22 September 1908 – 9 November 1992) was a German water polo player who competed in the 1928 Summer Olympics, the 1932 Summer Olympics, and the 1936 Summer Olympics.

At the Amsterdam Games he won the gold medal as member of the German team. He played all three matches and scored one goal.

In 1932, he was part of the German team which won the silver medal. He played all four matches.

Four years later he won his second silver medal with the German team. In Berlin he played six matches.

See also
 Germany men's Olympic water polo team records and statistics
 List of Olympic champions in men's water polo
 List of Olympic medalists in water polo (men)
 List of members of the International Swimming Hall of Fame

External links
 

1908 births
1992 deaths
German male water polo players
Water polo players at the 1928 Summer Olympics
Water polo players at the 1932 Summer Olympics
Water polo players at the 1936 Summer Olympics
Olympic water polo players of Germany
Olympic gold medalists for Germany
Olympic silver medalists for Germany
Olympic medalists in water polo
Medalists at the 1936 Summer Olympics
Medalists at the 1932 Summer Olympics
Medalists at the 1928 Summer Olympics